This is a list of international presidential trips made by Moon Jae-in, the 12th President of South Korea. During his presidency, which began with his inauguration on 10 May 2017 and ended with the inauguration of Yoon Suk-yeol on 10 May 2022. Moon Jae-in made 32 presidential trips to 40 states internationally.

Summary of presidential visits 
The number of visits per country where he travelled are:
One visit to Argentina, Australia, Austria, Belgium, Brunei, Cambodia, Czech Republic, Denmark, Egypt, Finland, France, Germany, Hungary, India, Indonesia,  Kazakhstan, Laos, Malaysia, Myanmar, New Zealand, Norway, Papua New Guinea, Philippines, Saudi Arabia, Spain, Sweden, Turkmenistan and Uzbekistan
Two visits to China, Italy, Japan, Russia, Singapore, Thailand, United Arab Emirates, United Kingdom, Vatican City and Vietnam
Three visits to North Korea
Eight visits to the United States

2017

2018

2019

2020
In 2020, Moon did not make any international trips, due to the COVID-19 pandemic.

2021

2022

Multilateral meetings
Moon Jae-in is scheduled to attend the following summits as South Korean President.

See also
 List of international trips made by presidents of South Korea
 List of international presidential trips made by Yoon Suk-yeol

References

Moon Jae-in Government
Moon Jae-in
Moon Jae-in
Moon Jae-in
2017 in international relations
2018 in international relations
2019 in international relations
2020 in international relations
2021 in international relations
2022 in international relations
Moon Jae-in